is a male Japanese voice actor from Saitama, Japan.

Filmography

Anime
Baki the Grappler as Gym Member B (ep 6); Naito
Demonbane as Stone
Detective Loki as Thief (ep 2)
Fullmetal Alchemist as Examinee (ep 6)
Happiness! as Hachisuke Takamizo
Higurashi no Naku Koro ni as Katsuya Kumagai
Hikaru no Go as Baseball Team member (ep 64); Chinese Pro (ep 67); Natsume
Knight Hunters Eternity (eps 1,3,5,6)
Kokoro Library as Gentleman (ep 2)
Naruto as Shigure
Please Twins! as Gonta
Kimi ga Nozomu Eien as Coach
Saiyuki as Guard
Shrine of the Morning Mist as Blue Demon (eps 8–9)
Sugar: A Little Snow Fairy as Neighbor (ep 15)

Drama CDs
Danna-sama, Ote wo Douzo (Kunihiro Murata)

Video Games
Puyo Puyo Fever - Tarutaru, Hohow Bird
Puyo Puyo Fever 2 - Tarutaru, Hohow Bird
Puyo Puyo!! Quest - Tarutaru, Hohow Bird
Puyo Puyo!! Quest Arcade - Tarutaru

Dubbing
Black Hawk Down, PFC Todd Blackburn (Orlando Bloom)
District 9, Fundiswa Mhlanga (Mandla Gaduka)
John Q., Freddy B. (Keram Malicki-Sánchez)
Saturday Night Fever, Joey (Joseph Cali)

References

External links
 
  Takuo Kawamura's personal site

1975 births
Living people
Japanese male video game actors
Japanese male voice actors
Male voice actors from Saitama Prefecture